Jochiwon is a town located in Sejong City, South Korea.

Jochiwon is located in South Chungcheong Province. As of 2011, Jochiwon has a large foreign community consisting of native English speakers considering its rather small size and population. This is due to the existence of two major universities: Hong-ik University and Korea University Korea University Sejong Campus, both satellite campuses. In addition to the universities, there are numerous public schools.

Many of the foreign teachers that work in Jochiwon live in the Chim-san-ri neighborhood where you will find numerous restaurants, mini-markets, bars, karaoke room businesses, batting cages and other games, internet cafes, apartments, bakeries, markets and a park. The estimated native English foreigner contingency is 50.

Jochiwon is centrally located on Korail's Gyeongbu line. It is a 90-minute ride on Mugunghwa-ho to Seoul and trains run approximately every 30 minutes. Just outside Jochiwon town limits is the town of Osong home to Osong Station, a station with KTX service.

Jochiwon is conveniently located between three major South Korean cities: Daejeon, Cheonan and Cheongju. Each offers access to creature comforts (Western chain restaurants and shopping) that cannot be found in Jochiwon.

Notable people
 Song So-hee; Gugak, Minyo musician

External links
 Jochiwon-eup 

Towns and townships in Sejong